Nobody Beats The Beats is a Danish musical collective founded by DJ Typhoon of Boulevard Connection fame.

The members have collaborated on three albums with the Nobody Beats The Beats name, distributed by Typhoon's Sonny B Recordings.

Three of the members have also released solo albums with many features from other members.

Despite being a hugely popular underground act, the group have also had many hits on Danish radio.

Guest appearances

Black Thought
Brand Nubian
Grand Puba
Guru (rapper)
Madlib

External links
inthemix.com.au : Nobody Beats the Beats - Drops from Above (Sonny B/Universal)

Danish musical groups